is a former Japanese football player.

Playing career
Miyagawa was born in Yokohama on March 24, 1977. He joined J2 League club Sagan Tosu in 2001. He played many matches as center back and became a regular player in July 2002. In 2003 season, although he could hardly play in the match until summer, he became a regular player in July again. However he could hardly play in the match in 2004 and retired end of 2004 season.

Club statistics

References

External links

1977 births
Living people
Association football people from Kanagawa Prefecture
Japanese footballers
J2 League players
Sagan Tosu players
Association football defenders